Shockwave (occasionally stylized as ShockWave or Shock Wave) was a roller coaster manufactured by Arrow Dynamics at Six Flags Great America in Gurnee, Illinois. Shockwave was closed in 2002 and has been dismantled.

History 
In late 1987, Six Flags Great America announced that they would be getting Shockwave for the 1988 season. The ride would be placed towards the front of the park in the Orleans Place section. Shockwave was set to open in April 1988, but the opening was delayed to June 3.

Shockwave was designed by Ron Toomer at Arrow Dynamics, and its seven inversions set a new world record among roller coasters previously held by Vortex at Kings Island, which opened a year earlier. Shockwave, Great American Scream Machine, and Viper were all designed by Arrow Dynamics and featured the same inverting elements in the same order.

Operational issues

Shockwave was plagued with some operational issues throughout its lifetime. Due to the speed and stress from the train negotiating the first vertical loop, a track fracture developed and needed attention on a regular basis in order to remain safe for operation. The wheels for the ride were expensive and wore out quickly according to ride operators, which required a vigilant crew and frequent 10-15 minute closures for maintenance staff to be dispatched to change them out. Shockwave also gained a reputation as a rough ride. A sharp turn located after the third vertical loop and before the mid-course brake run was most notable, often resulting in unprepared riders smashing their heads on the restraints.

Low ridership, reports of minor injuries, and high maintenance costs ultimately led to the coaster's demise. On September 24, 2002, Six Flags Great America announced that Shockwave would not reopen for the 2003 season. The ride was taken down in the fall of 2002 to make way for Superman: Ultimate Flight, which was originally scheduled to replace the smaller Whizzer roller coaster. Following negative backlash from enthusiasts and parkgoers, the park reversed course and decided to replace Shockwave instead. It was placed into storage behind the park and offered for sale, but it was ultimately scrapped when those efforts failed.

Remnants

After the installation of Superman: Ultimate Flight, much of Shockwave was demolished and sold as scrap in 2004, although certain pieces can still be found throughout the park today:
Most of the track and supports went to a scrapyard in Zion, IL.
The red train went to Six Flags Great Adventure to use for spare parts on this ride's near-identical twin, Great American Scream Machine.
The yellow and blue trains went to Six Flags Magic Mountain for parts on their similar seven-inversion coaster Viper.
The sign at the ride's entrance was donated to the American Coaster Enthusiasts' Museum.
Several bolts were auctioned off at a coaster convention.
A few support poles remain in Great America's employee parking lot.
The lift motor was installed on the park's Demon roller coaster, also by Arrow.
The large metal gates that were once part of Shockwave's entrance were painted black and can be found during Fright Fest as part of the entrance to the Seven Sins Cemetery.
A portion of the spiral staircase once used to gain access to a maintenance platform between the third loop and block brake is now used at the base of Whizzer's lift hill.
An air compressor and a scrap of track are being used as props for Fright Fest.
The station was moved into the junk/bone yard area near the employee parking lot and was boarded up and is now used for storage.
The main queue house for Shockwave was retained and is used now as the queue house for Superman: Ultimate Flight.
A small segment of track was re-fabricated for use on Demon to replace a corroding segment of track.
The sign for the gift shop Thrillseekers, which was located at the exit of Shockwave, is now at the exit of Goliath.  The sign features a corkscrew element that was in Shockwave, even though Goliath does not have a corkscrew.
At Fright Fest, a gravestone remembers Shockwave saying "They said "Save The Whizzer" and Shockwave became chopped liver" at the Six Saints Cemetery.

Ride experience
On Shockwave, riders were seated and pulled down their over-the-shoulder restraints. They exited the station, rolling over the transfer track, and entered a short drop before making a tight un-banked U-turn toward the lift. Once at the top of the lift, the riders entered the roughly 150-degrees-to-the-left twisting drop, speeding down to the ground. A roughly 90-degree left turn followed, and then the two  consecutive vertical loops. Next, the train rose up and negotiated a very tight left turn into the mid-course/block brake. After a braking, riders went through a zig-zag turn and drop and entered the boomerang, getting their pictures taken between the two inversions. Upon exiting the element, the train made a roughly 180-degree turn to the right and entered the two back-to-back "right-hand" or "clockwise" corkscrews. Finally, riders went over a small bunny hill and made a roughly 210-degree turn to the left, entering the long brake run leading to the station.

References

External links
Shockwave on RCDB

Roller coasters operated by Six Flags
Six Flags Great America
Former roller coasters in Illinois